Undressd (styled as UNDRESSD) is a Swedish musical duo, comprising Elina Mayskär and Erik Pettersson. Their cover of Alphaville song "Forever Young", peaked at No. 40 on the official Swedish Singles Chart.

Undressd was formed in 2018 by producer Erik Pettersson (co-founder, label owner and manager of RadioAddict Music Group), together with Elina Mayskär, a vocalist from Karlskrona, with an ambition to bring the old times back to life. Their first single "Forever Young" (originally by Alphaville) were released in May 2019, which peaked at No. 40 on the Sverigetopplistan. It remained in the top 100 for a total of fifteen weeks. In May 2020 they released a second single, "Girls Just Wanna Have Fun", (originally by Cyndi Lauper). They also release Swedish songs, under the stage name, Under.

Discography

References 

Musical groups established in 2018
English-language singers from Sweden
Swedish pop music groups
Swedish musical duos
Male–female musical duos
Pop music duos
2018 establishments in Sweden